Glenanda is a suburb of Johannesburg, South Africa. It is located in Region F. Glenanda borders the suburbs of Glenvista, Suideroord and Winchester Hills. Glenanda has its own public library, service station and local shopping centre. Glenanda Primary School was established there in 1976 and services Glenanda as well as the surrounding areas. Glenanda is in close proximity to The Glen Shopping Centre with an average travelling time of five minutes.

Glenanda had a local scout and venue hall but it has been bought out and converted into a church with church services every Sunday.

References

Johannesburg Region F